Afoninskaya is a rural locality (a village) in Nizhne-Vazhskoye Rural Settlement, Verkhovazhsky District, Vologda Oblast, Russia. The population was 12 as of 2002.

Geography 
The distance to Verkhovazhye is 5.3 km, to Naumikha is 7.2 km. Dudorovo is the nearest rural locality.

References 

Rural localities in Verkhovazhsky District